Super-Charger Hell is a tribute album dedicated to American heavy metal band White Zombie. The album name is a reference to the song "Super-Charger Heaven" from Astro-Creep 2000.

Track listing

References

2000 albums
Tribute albums
Covers albums
White Zombie (band)